Problepsis flavistigma is a moth of the family Geometridae. It is found in Kenya and Sierra Leone.

Subspecies
Problepsis flavistigma flavistigma
Problepsis flavistigma dilatistigma L. B. Prout, 1917 (Kenya)

References

Moths described in 1904
Scopulini
Moths of Africa